The Alexander Column is a monument erected 1894 in Nakhichevan-on-Don (now a part of Rostov-on-Don, Rostov Oblast, Russia) in Alexandrovsky Park (now Vitya Cherevichkin Park).

The column was inaugurated on 18 September 1894 to celebrate the 25 years reign of emperor Alexander II of Russia. On the occasion the park in which the column stands was also renamed after the sovereign.

The column consists of a granite monolith upon which sits a double-headed eagle perched on a globe. On the pedestal two commemorative plaques read: ″In memory of 25 glorious year of reign of Emperor Alexander II″ and ″the Armenian community of Nakhichevan-on-Don 25·IX·1894″

After the Russian revolution the column was the only tsarist monument not to be torn down by the new authorities. They only removed the crowning double-headed eagle and the commemorative plaques on the pedestal. In 1994 the column was returned to its original state.

References 

Bronze sculptures in Russia
Cultural heritage monuments in Rostov-on-Don
Monuments and memorials in Rostov-on-Don
Cultural heritage monuments of regional significance in Rostov Oblast